During the 2013 rugby league season, the English team Wakefield Trinity (then known as Wakefield Trinity Wildcats) played in the Super League.

Super League results

References

Wakefield Trinity seasons
Super League XVIII by club